The additional member system (AMS) is a mixed electoral system under which most representatives are elected in single-member districts (SMDs), and the other "additional members" are elected to make the seat distribution in the chamber more proportional to the way votes are cast for party lists. It is distinct from parallel voting (also known as the supplementary member system) in that the "additional member" seats are awarded to parties taking into account seats won in SMDs (referred to as compensation or "top-up"), which is not done under parallel voting (a non-compensatory method).

AMS is categorised under semi-proportional electoral systems, differently from the mixed-member proportional representation (MMP). In practice, the way that proportional additional member systems work depends on the number of additional ("top-up") seats and the votes cast in a  specific election.

This article focuses primarily on semi-proportional implementations of AMS, like the ones used in the UK. AMS is used by the Scottish Parliament, the Welsh Parliament and the London Assembly. In Scotland and Wales list members ("top-up" seats) are elected by region; in London there is a single London-wide pooling of list votes.

How AMS works 

In an election using the additional member system, each voter usually casts two votes: a vote for a candidate standing in their local constituency (with or without an affiliated party), and a vote for a party list standing in a wider region made up of multiple constituencies (or a single nationwide constituency).

Voters are not required to vote for the same party in the constituency and regional votes. If a voter votes for different parties at the constituency and regional levels this is referred to as split-ticket voting. In the regional vote, the voter votes for a specific party, but has no control over which candidates from the party are elected. On the other hand, in the constituency vote, the voter votes for a specific candidate rather than a party.

The main variation was the 1993 Italian electoral law for the Senate, later abolished in 2005. In that case, voters could cast only a single vote, while regional party lists were automatically created with the losers in the FPTP races. That system could be described as a mixed single vote.

Calculation of votes 
The first vote is used to elect a member from their constituency under the first past the post (FPTP) system (i.e. in the constituency, the candidate with the most votes takes the seat).

The second vote is used to determine how many additional seats a party may get. Parties receive additional seats to match the voting percentages which they received, making the legislature more representative of voters' preferences.

In the model of AMS used in the United Kingdom, the regional seats are divided using a D'Hondt method. However, the number of seats already won in the local constituencies is taken into account in the calculations for the list seats, and the first average taken in account for each party follows the number of FPTP seats won. For example, if a party won 5 constituency seats, then the first D'Hondt divisor taken for that party would be 6 (5 seats + 1), not 1. In South Korea, which uses the largest remainder method, constituency seats are taken into account by subtracting the number of list votes a party got with the number of FPTP seats it won, with the result then being divided by 2.

Example 
In a 100 seat assembly 70 members are elected in single-member constituencies. Because the system generally favours the largest party and those parties/candidate that are strong in a particular region, the total result of the FPTP elections can be very disproportional. In this example, the party with a plurality in the popular vote (party A) won a majority of all seats (54), while the second largest party (B) only won 11 districts. One of the two smaller parties (party C) won no districts, despite having 13% support nationwide, but a smaller (regional) party with only 3% nationally did get 5 of their candidates elected, as their voters were concentrated in those constituencies.

In the example, additional seats are assigned on a nationwide level. Parties A and D are already overrepresented, so they are not entitled to additional seats. Parties B and C receive top-up seats, as there are only 30, this is not enough to make the results proportional.

Compared to similar systems 
If the 30 additional seats in the example were allocated independently by list-PR the system would be called parallel voting or a supplementary vote system. This would be a mixed-member majoritarian system, under which even party A received additional seats, even though it is overrepresented even without getting any.

Mixed-member proportional systems, like the ones used for elected the national parliaments of Germany and New Zealand, compensate for overhang seats as well, by adding seats to the assembly if needed. In the most basic implementation, like that used in New Zealand (and until 2013, also in Germany), only the parties with a seat deficit are given the additional seats, and only to compensate for their deficit, which is not a perfect correction for the disproportionality. An implementation with leveling seats, like the one used in Germany from 2013, adds even more additional seats (called leveling seats) to the assembly to ensure full proportionality.

In this example, the assembly size is increased by 13 to compensate for parties B and C's seat deficits under the basic implementation, and by 65 (which allows parties A, B and C to receive more seats) under the leveling seats implementation.

The additional member system sometimes provides proportional representation (when there are no overhang seats that would need to be compensated), in which case it the same as MMP, if the results of the FPTP elections were completely proportional (which is almost never the case in reality). If decoy-lists and tactical voting are used (see below) the results under AMS would be the same as under parallel voting.

In all other cases AMS is more proportional than parallel voting, but less proportional than MMP.

Threshold 

As in many systems containing or based upon party-list representation, in order to be eligible for list seats in some AMS models, a party must earn at least a certain percentage of the total party vote, or no candidates will be elected from the party list. Candidates having won a constituency will still have won their seat. In almost all elections in the UK there are no thresholds except the "effective threshold" inherent in the regional structure. However the elections for the London Assembly have a threshold of 5% which has at times denied seats to the Christian Peoples Alliance (in the 2000 election), the British National Party, Respect – The Unity Coalition (both in the 2004 election), and the Women's Equality Party (in the 2016 election).

Definitions and variations of AMS

AMS vs. MMP 
AMS was also incorrectly used as another term to mean mixed-member proportional representation (MMP), but (as the term additional member system is used here) AMS, unlike some MMP systems, does not compensate for the disproportionate results caused by a leading party taking so many district seats that the fixed number of top-up seats cannot compensate. Such is the case where the leading party takes overhang seats and the legislature has a fixed number of seats. In some MMP systems, leveling seats (extra additional members) are filled in such a way as to ensure parties have proportional representation.

Due to the problem of district contests electing too many members for leading parties (overhang), the AMS systems discussed here, instead of producing fully proportional results, often produce only semi-proportional representation. However, even semi-proportional representation is a considered by some a great advance on a electoral system that uses only the first-past-the-post voting system, where the number of seats a party takes only vaguely reflects the number of votes that party receives.

The term additional member system, as introduced by the Hansard Society, has been confused in the literature by the term mixed member proportional representation (in the broader sense) coined by New Zealand's Royal Commission on the Electoral System (1984–1986). 

Ways to make the UK elections using AMS more proportional are discussed below. Also discussed are ways for voters to cast votes for individual candidate and not just for parties. The MMP systems used in Bavaria and elsewhere in Germany are discussed below for example.

Variations of AMS 
The Arbuthnott Commission recommended that Scotland change to a model where the voter can vote for a specific regional candidate as well (called an open list), but this has not been implemented. A similar system is used in Bavaria, where the second vote is not simply for the party but for one of the candidates on the party's regional list and both votes count for party and candidates so that every vote counts twice (Bavaria uses seven regions for this purpose). In Baden-Württemberg there are no lists; they use the "best near-winner" method (Zweitmandat) in a four-region model, where the regional members are the local candidates of the under-represented party in that region who received the most votes in their local constituency without being elected in it, but this model has not been copied in the United Kingdom. 

To produce more proportional results without increasing the number of seats in the chamber, reforms might include changing the way district members are elected. If STV or SNTV is used, the district elections are likely to be more proportional than if districts seats are filled through First past the post, and thus the available top-up seats could be used to produce more proportional overall chamber composition.

Tactical voting

Decoy lists 
So-called "decoy lists" are a trick to unhinge the compensation mechanisms contained into the proportional part of the AMS, so to de facto establish a parallel voting system.

For instance in the 2001 Italian general election, where a system in many respects similar to AMS was used, one of the two main coalitions (the House of Freedoms coalition, which opposed the scorporo system) linked many of their constituency candidates to a decoy list (liste civetta) in the proportional parts, under the name Abolizione Scorporo. As a defensive move, the other coalition, Olive Tree, felt obliged to do the same, under the name Paese Nuovo. The constituency seats won by each coalition would not reduce the number of proportional seats they received. Between them, the two decoy lists won 360 of the 475 constituency seats, more than half of the total of 630 seats available, despite winning a combined total of less than 0.2% of the national proportional part of the vote. In the case of Forza Italia (part of the House of Freedoms), the tactic was so successful that it did not have enough candidates in the proportional part to receive as many seats as it in fact won, missing out on 12 seats.

Although a theoretical possibility, decoy lists are not used in Scotland, Wales, or most other places using AMS, where most voters vote for candidates from parties with long-standing names. In the run up to the 2007 Scottish election, the Labour party had considered not fielding list candidates in the Glasgow, West of Scotland, and Central Scotland regions, as their constituency strength in the previous two elections had resulted in no list MSPs; instead they proposed to support a list composed of Co-operative Party candidates. Before this the Co-operative party had chosen not to field candidates of its own but merely to endorse particular Labour candidates. However the Electoral Commission ruled that as membership of the Co-operative party is dependent on membership of the Labour party they could not be considered distinct legal entities.

In contrast, in the 2007 Welsh Assembly election, Forward Wales had its candidates (including sitting leader John Marek) stand as independents, to attempt to gain list seats they would not be entitled to if Forward Wales candidates were elected to constituencies in the given region. However the ruse failed: Marek lost his seat in Wrexham and Forward Wales failed to qualify for any top-up seats.

For the 2020 South Korean legislative election the electoral system was changed and a partial use of AMS was implemented. In response, there were two satellite parties that only ran in the proportional part, the Future Korea Party (controlled by the United Future Party) and the Platform Party (controlled by the Democratic Party of Korea). Both merged with the parent party after the election.

In the 2021 Scottish Parliament election, former SNP leader, Alex Salmond announced his leadership of the newly formed Alba Party, with the stated aim of winning list seats for pro-independence candidates. At the party's public launch, Salmond quoted polling suggesting the SNP would receive a million votes in the forthcoming election but win no regional seats. He said that having Alba candidates on the regional lists would end the "wasted votes", and the number of independence supporting MSPs could reach 90 or more.

Use 
AMS is used in:

 Unicameral nation/city elections in the United Kingdom:
 Scotland: the Scottish Parliament
 Wales: the Senedd (Welsh Parliament), formerly the National Assembly for Wales
 London: the London Assembly
 Bicameral general elections in Bolivia:
 the Chamber of Deputies (Lower house).
 Unicameral general elections in South Korea (for some seats besides parallel voting):
 the National Assembly, even if decoy lists largely change it into a de facto parallel voting system

It was used from 1953 to 2011 in Germany:

 the Bundestag, if there are more overhang seats than proportional seats, these have been added to the legal size of the parliament

In 1976, the Hansard Society recommended that a mixed electoral system in a form different from the German be used for UK parliamentary elections, but instead of using closed party lists, it proposed that seats be filled by the "best runner-up" basis used by the German state of Baden-Württemberg, where the compensatory seats are filled by the party's defeated candidates who were the "best near-winner" in each of the state's four regions. It was the way that compensatory seats were allocated that made their report the origin of the additional member system, the term which the report also invented, which was then applied along with the much older "mixed system" by English-speaking writers on voting systems to West Germany's system and similar models until mixed member proportional (MMP) was invented for the adoption of the German system proposed for New Zealand in a royal commission report in 1986, which would explain why AMS and MMP have been used as synonyms. The system the Hansard Society proposed was eventually adopted but with closed lists instead of the "best runner-up" (popularly known in Britain as "best losers") provision for elections to the Scottish Parliament, Senedd and London Assembly, but not for that proposed for elections to the House of Commons.

This system was proposed by the Independent Commission in 1999, known as Alternative vote top-up (AV+). This would have involved the use of the Alternative Vote for electing members from single-member constituencies, and regional open party lists. However, contrary to the Labour Party's earlier manifesto promises, no referendum was held before the 2001 general election and the statement was not repeated.

The AMS system in use in the London Assembly would have been used for the other proposed regional assemblies of England, but after the overwhelming No vote in the 2004 North East England devolution referendum, the Government abolished all the regional assemblies in 2008-2010.

Scotland 

The system implemented for the Scottish Parliament is known to make it more difficult for any one party to win an outright majority, compared to the first-past-the-post system used for general elections to the UK Parliament in Westminster. However, in 2011, the Scottish National Party won 69 seats, a majority of four.

In the first election for Scotland's new Parliament, the majority of voters surveyed misunderstood some key aspects of the difference there between the "first" (constituency) vote and the "second" (regional list) vote; indeed in some ways the understanding worsened in the second election.

The Arbuthnott Commission found references to first and second votes fuelled a misconception that the constituency vote should be a first preference and the regional vote a second one. That misconception was not helped by the Green Party's tactic of running only regional candidates and appealing for "second votes".

To deal with the misunderstanding between "first" and "second" votes, the ballot for the 2007 Scottish Parliament election was changed as recommended by the Arbuthnott Commission. The British government announced on 22 November 2006 that the two separate ballot papers used in the previous Scottish Parliament elections would be replaced for the elections in May 2007 by a single paper, with the left side listing the parties standing for election as regional MSPs and the right side the candidates standing as constituency MSPs.

See also 
 Mixed-member proportional representation (the more proportional versions of AMS)
 Parallel voting (the non-compensatory equivalent of AMS)
Mixed single vote (a modified, positive vote transfer based variant of AMS used in Hungary for local elections)
 Scorporo (a modified, negative vote transfer based variant of AMS formerly used in Italy)
 Mixed electoral system
 Semi-proportional representation

References 

Semi-proportional electoral systems
Mixed electoral systems
Electoral reform in the United Kingdom
Electoral systems